Semide is a commune in the Ardennes department in the Grand Est region in northern of France.

History
Semide has not always been what it is today. Formerly, the chalky soil gave bad harvest. This poor land, where resinous had been plant under the Second Empire provided to the sheep kine sparse grass.
In the 1960s, Semide underwent a change which has modified its economy, its way of life and the landscape. Mecanisation, motorisation, clearing, fertilizer utilization and regrouping of lands mark out the intensive farming beginning dominates by cereals.

Population
The inhabitants are called Semidas.

Sights
 St-Pierre St-Paul Church from the twelfth century.
 Big Bertha : Vestige of an installation of a Langer Max (officially called 38 cm SKL/45), wrongly called by usage Big Bertha.
 National graveyard from the First World War.

Economy
Semide main's activity is farming, predominantly cereal and sugar beet production.

See also
Communes of the Ardennes department

References

External links

 Semide youth guild Website

Communes of Ardennes (department)
Ardennes communes articles needing translation from French Wikipedia